Ron E. Hull (April 18, 1940 – July 22, 2001) was an American football player and coach.  He played for the UCLA Bruins football team from 1959 to 1961. He was captain of the 1961 UCLA football team that won the conference championship and lost to Minnesota in the 1962 Rose Bowl. He was selected by the Football Writers Association of America as the first-team center on the 1961 College Football All-America Team.  Hull later worked for 37 years as a physical education instructor at Cal State Los Angeles and was the school's head football coach in 1976 and 1977.  He died of heart failure at age 61 in 2001.

References

1940 births
2001 deaths
American football centers
Cal State Los Angeles Diablos football coaches
UCLA Bruins football players
All-American college football players
Players of American football from Los Angeles
Coaches of American football from California
Woodrow Wilson High School (Los Angeles) alumni
Sports coaches from Los Angeles